Guru Prasad Maurya is an Indian politician from the BJP party, who is currently Member of the Uttar Pradesh Legislative Assembly from Phaphamau Assembly constituency.

References

Uttar Pradesh politicians